HMS Eminent (W 116) was a  of the Royal Navy during World War II.

Service history 
Eminent was laid down on 22 May 1942 by the Defoe Shipbuilding Company in Bay City, Michigan, as BAT-10, launched 12 August 1942 and commissioned into the Royal Navy under Lend-Lease on 14 September 1942.  She served throughout the war with the Royal Navy and was returned to the United States Navy on 13 June 1946 in Subic Bay and struck on 8 May. She was sold to Chinese owners on 24 September 1946, renamed Ming 105 and then renamed Ming 305. She was deleted in 1992 and scrapped in 2005.

References 

1942 ships
Favourite-class tugboats
Ships built in Bay City, Michigan